The 1952–53 Soviet Championship League season was the seventh season of the Soviet Championship League, the top level of ice hockey in the Soviet Union. Seventeen teams participated in the league, and VVS MVO Moscow won the championship.

First round

Group A

Group B

Group C

Final round

7th place

External links
Season on hockeystars.ru

Soviet League seasons
1952–53 in Soviet ice hockey
Soviet